The 1963 Five Nations Championship was the thirty-fourth series of the rugby union Five Nations Championship. Including the previous incarnations as the Home Nations and Five Nations, this was the sixty-ninth series of the northern hemisphere rugby union championship. Ten matches were played between 12 January and 23 March. It was contested by England, France, Ireland, Scotland and Wales. England won their 17th title.

Ireland v England finished 0-0, the first scoreless draw between both teams since 1910.

Participants
The teams involved were:

Table

Results

References

External links

The official RBS Six Nations Site

Six Nations Championship seasons
Five Nations
Five Nations
Five Nations
Five Nations
Five Nations
Five Nations
Five Nations
Five Nations
Five Nations